"Ice in the Sun" is a song by the band Status Quo. The track was recorded in 1968, and appeared on Picturesque Matchstickable Messages from the Status Quo, an album by Status Quo that was released in August that year.

"Ice in the Sun" was also released as a single in the UK in August 1968.  Written by Marty Wilde and Ronnie Scott (not the famous jazz musician), and produced by John Schroeder, the song was Status Quo's second hit single.

It reached number 8 in the UK Singles Chart, spending twelve weeks in the listing, and number 29 in the Canadian RPM charts. In the U.S., the song peaked at number 70 on the Billboard Hot 100 and it was to be their last appearance in the U.S. charts.

The track has appeared on numerous compilation albums including XS All Areas - The Greatest Hits, Whatever You Want - The Very Best of Status Quo and From the Makers of....

Singles
 1968: "Ice in the Sun" / "When My Mind Is Not Live" 45 rpm 7" : Pye / 7N 17581 
 1968: "Hielo en el sol" / "Velos negros de melancolía" 45 rpm 7" : Pye / H 387
 1969: "Ice in the Sun" / "Pictures of Matchstick Men" 45 rpm 7" : Pye / L-2222-Y

Charts

References

External links
Single details @ Discogs.com

1968 singles
Pye Records singles
Status Quo (band) songs
British songs
Songs written by Marty Wilde
Songs written by Ronnie Scott (songwriter)
Song recordings produced by John Schroeder (musician)
1968 songs